Sabine von Maydell (born 9 October 1955, Baden-Baden, Germany) is a German television actress. From October 1984 to March 2014, she was married to actor Claude-Oliver Rudolph. She has a son and a daughter, Oona von Maydell, who is also an actress.

Selected filmography
 Derrick - Season 3, Episode 2: "Tod der Trompeters" (1976)
  (1977)
 Derrick - Season 4, Episode 3: "Eine Nacht im Oktober" (1977)
 Derrick - Season 6, Episode 12: "Ein Todesengel" (1979)
  (1979)
 Wir (1982) (based on We, the 1921 Russian novel by Yevgeny Zamyatin)
  (1993)

External links

Hübchen Agency Berlin 

German film actresses
German television actresses
1955 births
Living people
People from Baden-Baden
20th-century German actresses
21st-century German actresses